Benedikt Ásgeirsson (born 7 February 1951, in Reykjavík) is an Icelandic diplomat and the Ambassador Extraordinary and Plenipotentiary of the Republic of Iceland to the Russian Federation.

See also 
 Embassy of Iceland in Moscow

References 

Benedikt Asgeirsson
Benedikt Asgeirsson
Benedikt Asgeirsson
Benedikt Asgeirsson
Benedikt Asgeirsson
Benedikt Asgeirsson
1951 births
Living people